Jaracz is a Polish-language surname. Notable people with the surname include:

Barbara Jaracz, Polish  chess Woman Grandmaster
Paweł Jaracz, Polish chess Grandmaster
Stefan Jaracz, Polish actor and theater producer
Thad Jaracz, American  basketball player

See also
Jaracz, Greater Poland Voivodeship, a settlement in Poland

Polish-language surnames